The fictional supervillain Penguin, created by Bob Kane and Bill Finger, made his first appearance in Detective Comics #58 (December 1941). Since then, he has been adapted into other forms of media, including feature films, television series, and video games.

Television

Live-action

Batman (1966–1968 TV series)

Burgess Meredith portrayed The Penguin in the 1960s Batman television series. (He would also make a brief cameo appearance as the Penguin in the 1968 episode of The Monkees entitled "Monkees Blow Their Minds".) His performance is remembered for his signature "quacking" laugh, which Meredith used to cover a cough caused by the character's cigarettes.

In the 1960s series, The Penguin is identified exclusively as "Mr. Penguin" (or occasionally "Mr. P. N. Guinn", which he uses as an alias), with no reference to the name ("Oswald Cobblepot") he is given in other media. In one episode, he claims to have been an actor. 

The Penguin also appears in the theatrical film spin-off, where he commands a penguin-like submarine.

Gotham

Robin Lord Taylor plays a young Penguin, by the name of Oswald Cobblepot, in the TV series Gotham, where he has been called a breakout character. The series follows his journey to power, starting as a ruthless small-time criminal working for mobster Fish Mooney (Jada Pinkett Smith), and his love-hate relationship with fellow criminal Edward Nygma (Cory Michael Smith).

Titans
Penguin does not appear in Titans, but Dick Grayson references him in the episode "Donna Troy", and his umbrella appears in the Batcave in the episode "Barbara Gordon".

Batwoman
Penguin (mentioned in the episode "I'll Be The Judge, I'll Be The Jury" to be a former mayor of Gotham City) does not appear in Batwoman, but his hypnotic umbrella plays a role in several episodes, including "Kane, Kate", "Power", "Meet Your Maker", and "We Having Fun Yet?".

The Penguin
In March 2022, HBO Max ordered a standalone series centered on The Penguin, following on from his appearance in the Matt Reeves film The Batman (2022). Colin Farrell has signed on to reprise his film role as The Penguin; Matt Reeves is acting as executive producer, and Lauren LeFranc as showrunner.

Animation

 The Penguin, voiced by Ted Knight, appears in Filmation's The Adventures of Batman.
 The Penguin, again voiced by Ted Knight, appears along with the Joker in the first two episodes of The New Scooby-Doo Movies ("The Dynamic Scooby Doo Affair" and "The Caped Crusader Caper", later combined on the DVD Scooby-Doo Meets Batman).
 The Penguin was originally supposed to appear in the Challenge of the Super Friends season of Super Friends as a member of the Legion of Doom. However, due to the development of Filmation's The New Adventures of Batman, the Penguin was restricted to appear in the show.
 The Penguin, voiced by Lennie Weinrib, appears in The New Adventures of Batman.
 The Penguin, voiced by Robert Morse, appears in The Super Powers Team: Galactic Guardians episode "The Case of the Stolen Powers", where he gains Superman's superpowers by accident when his prison cellmate Felix Faust tries to get them for himself.
 The Penguin appears in a number of installments of the DC Animated Universe, voiced by Paul Williams (except in the direct-to-video film Batman: Mystery of the Batwoman, where he is voiced by David Ogden Stiers):
 Batman: The Animated Series
 The New Batman Adventures
 The Superman: The Animated Series episode "Knight Time", in which Superman (disguised as Batman) and Robin interrogate him to find the Mad Hatter.
 The Penguin appears in The Batman, voiced by Tom Kenny. This version turned to crime to rebuild his wealth and re-establish the Cobblepot family name.
 The Penguin appears in Batman: The Brave and the Bold, voiced by Stephen Root.
 The Penguin appears in Justice League Action, voiced by Dana Snyder.
 The Penguin, voiced by Wayne Knight, appears in the Harley Quinn episodes "A High Bar" (where he throws a lavish Bar Mitzvah for his nephew Joshua, voiced by Sean Giambrone)  and "The New Gotham" (where he rules over part of a devastated Gotham until his demise at the hands of Harley Quinn).
 The Penguin appears in the DC Super Hero Girls episode "#EmperorPenguin", voiced by Alexander Polinsky.

Film

Live-action

 The Penguin, portrayed by Burgess Meredith, appears in the 1966 film Batman.

 The Penguin appears in Batman Returns, portrayed by Danny DeVito.
 The Penguin appears in The Batman, portrayed by Colin Farrell. This version is Carmine Falcone's right-hand man, who resents the Penguin nickname.

Animation
 The Penguin, appears in Batman: Mystery of the Batwoman, voiced by David Ogden Stiers. He is involved in an illegal arms deal with the President of Kasnia and clashes with Dr. Roxanne Ballantine (one of three Batwomen appearing in the film).
 The Penguin appears in The Batman vs. Dracula, voiced again by Tom Kenny. He accidentally resurrects Dracula and is hypnotized into working for him until their eventual defeat.
 The Penguin, voiced by Steve Blum, appears in Lego Batman: The Movie – DC Super Heroes Unite (an adaptation of the video game of the same name).
 The Penguin's umbrella can be seen in the Batcave at the end of Justice League: The Flashpoint Paradox.
 The Penguin appears in Batman: Assault on Arkham, voiced by Nolan North, where he shelters the Suicide Squad in his Iceberg Lounge.
 The Penguin appears in Lego DC Comics Super Heroes: Justice League vs. Bizarro League, voiced again by Tom Kenny. Gorilla Grodd brainwashes him along with several other villains into stealing crates of bananas.
 The Penguin, voiced by Dana Snyder, appears in the Batman Unlimited series of films, voiced again by Dana Snyder. Equipped with a robotic monocle and supported by his "Animalitia" (Cheetah, Killer Croc, Silverback, and Man-Bat), he assembles an army of animal robots and plans to destroy Gotham with meteorites.
 The Penguin appears in Lego DC Comics Super Heroes: Justice League: Attack of the Legion of Doom, voiced again by Tom Kenny, where he auditions for a spot in the Legion of Doom.
 The Penguin makes a cameo appearance in a car chase at the end of Batman: Bad Blood.
 The Penguin appears in Lego DC Comics Super Heroes: Justice League: Gotham City Breakout, voiced again by Tom Kenny.
 The Penguin, voiced by William Salyers, appears in Batman: Return of the Caped Crusaders and its sequel Batman vs. Two-Face, which are both based on the 1966 Batman series.
 The Penguin, voiced by an uncredited John Venzon, appears in The Lego Batman Movie as one of the numerous villains trying to destroy Gotham.
 The Penguin appears in DC Super Heroes vs. Eagle Talon , voiced by Mitsuo Iwata.
 The Penguin appears in Scooby-Doo! & Batman: The Brave and the Bold, voiced again by Tom Kenny.
 The Penguin, voiced again by Tom Kenny, appears in Lego DC Comics Super Heroes: The Flash, where Batman and Reverse-Flash foil his plan to launch a giant missile.
 The Penguin appears in Batman Ninja, voiced by Chō in the Japanese dub and Tom Kenny in the English dub.
 The Penguin, voiced again by Tom Kenny, appears in the crossover film Batman vs. Teenage Mutant Ninja Turtles, where he attempts to steal technology from Wayne Enterprises and fights the Teenage Mutant Ninja Turtles.
 The Penguin appears in Lego DC Batman: Family Matters, voiced again by Tom Kenny.
 The Penguin appears in Lego DC: Shazam!: Magic and Monsters, voiced again by Tom Kenny.
 The Penguin appears in Batman: The Long Halloween, voiced by David Dastmalchian.
 The Penguin appears in Batman and Superman: Battle of the Super Sons, voiced again by Tom Kenny.
 The Penguin appears in Batwheels, voiced by Jess Harnell.

Video games

Lego Batman

 The Penguin appears in Lego Batman: The Videogame, voiced again by Tom Kenny. where he is one of the leaders of the Arkham breakout, employing Catwoman, Bane, Killer Croc, and Man-Bat in his plan to wreak havoc in Gotham with mind-controlled penguins. His submarine serves as the second boss of Chapter 2, "Power Crazed Penguin". 
 The Penguin, appears in Lego Batman 2: DC Super Heroes, voiced by Steve Blum. He rides with Bane and Poison Ivy on Bane's mole machine in the level "Arkham Asylum Antics", and appears at Gotham Zoo as an optional boss.
 The Penguin appears as a playable character in Lego Batman 3: Beyond Gotham, voiced by JB Blanc. He has two sidequests: one where the player must destroy his out-of-control penguins, and one where the player dresses like a penguin to listen to his childhood experiences of bullying.
 The Penguin appears in Lego DC Super-Villains, voiced again by JB Blanc.

Batman: Arkham

Penguin appears in the Batman: Arkham series, voiced by Nolan North in the main series and Ian Redford in Batman: Arkham VR. His characteristic monocle appears here as the bottom of a glass liquor bottle, supposedly shoved into his face by the friend of one of his victims and now lodged too deeply in his brain to remove.
 While the Penguin doesn't appear in Batman: Arkham Asylum, there are a number of references to him: his name appears among other villains on the party list, a security guard mentions past attempts to smuggle sharpened umbrellas into Arkham, an Iceberg Lounge advertisement can be seen in the Intensive Treatment wards, and  the old Arkham Mansion displays a collection of trick umbrellas and top hats.
 In Batman: Arkham City, the Penguin appears as a criminal kingpin, fighting Batman and holding Mr. Freeze and a number of undercover cops captive. Mr. Freeze adds insult to injury by locking Cobblepot in the exhibit planned for Bruce Wayne, where he remains for the rest of the game.
 In Batman: Arkham Origins, a young Penguin appears (sans monocle) as Gotham's number-one weapons dealer, living on his refitted cruise liner "The Final Offer" to evade the law. He abducts and tortures the heir of the Falcone mafia, and uses recon drones to spy on the Joker in disguise as Black Mask. In the DLC "Cold, Cold Heart", the Penguin betrays Mr. Freeze in his revenge mission against GothCorp CEO Ferris Boyle.
 In Batman: Arkham Origins Blackgate, the young Penguin returns as one of the criminals released in the Breakout, taking over the Cell Blocks and forcing Bronze Tiger to fight in a makeshift arena.
 In Batman: Arkham Knight, Batman and Nightwing team up to infiltrate Penguin's hideout, take down his weapon caches, and eventually capture him and take him to the GCPD. He also has minor appearances in the "Harley Quinn Story Pack" DLC and the Arkham Episode "GCPD Lockdown".
 The Penguin will appear in Suicide Squad: Kill the Justice League.

Batman: The Telltale Series
Penguin appears in Telltale Games' Batman series, voiced by Jason Spisak. This version is a childhood friend of Bruce Wayne who got his name from a beak-shaped gasmask he wears during his crimes.
 In the first season of Batman: The Telltale Series, The Penguin is a member of the Children of Arkham, helping the group get revenge on the Wayne family. Though he initially warns Bruce about their revolution, he leads the group in various attacks and helps take control of Wayne Enterprises as its CEO, using his position to help fund the group and monitor Gotham. Depending on player choices, Penguin may disfigure Harvey Dent during an attack on a mayoral debate by the Children of Arkham. In the fourth episode, Penguin hacks into the Batcomputer, forcing Bruce to choose between protecting his tech from Penguin and his home from Dent.
 In the second season, Batman: The Enemy Within, Penguin has been sentenced to forty years at Blackgate Penitentiary and does not appear in person, but his mask and one of his devices (either his "monocle" or his boxing gloves) are kept in a display in the Batcave.

Other games
 The Penguin has appeared as a boss in several Batman video games, including Batman: The Caped Crusader, the various video game adaptations of the movie Batman Returns, Batman: The Animated Series and The Adventures of Batman & Robin for the Super NES.
 The Penguin was cut from The Adventures of Batman & Robin for the Sega CD, but the storyboards for his planned animated cut-scene are displayed in Paul Dini's book Batman Animated.
 The Penguin is the chief villain of an online flash game, Batman: The Cobblebot Caper, modeled after The Batman animated series, where he plans to fight Gotham City with a giant mechanical phoenix.
 The Penguin appears in DC Universe Online, voiced by David Jennison. He runs a smuggling operation in Gotham's old subway tunnels, and plans to trick his various criminal competition into wiping each other out so he can take Gotham for himself.
 The Penguin appears as a summonable character in Scribblenauts Unmasked: A DC Comics Adventure.
 The Penguin makes a non-speaking cameo appearance in the Arkham Asylum level of Injustice: Gods Among Us.
 The Penguin was originally set to appear as a playable character in Injustice 2, but was scrapped and cut for unknown reasons.
 The Penguin appears in Gotham Knights, voiced by Elias Toufexis.

Toys
 The Mego Corporation released an 8" Penguin as part of their "World's Greatest Super-Heroes" line in 1974, and a " Penguin as a part of their Comic Action Heroes line in the 1970s.
 The Penguin appears as a minifigure in the Lego Batman set The Batcave: The Penguin and Mr. Freeze's Invasion, riding in a submarine and assisted by miniature penguin robots. In the Lego Batman promotional video, he appears as the final villain to be caught.
 The Penguin featured alongside other DC Comics villains and heroes in the 1980s Super Powers Collection toy-line. The Penguin figure wore a blue coat and top hat; squeezing his legs together triggering his arm to move up and down, waving his umbrella. This figure sculpt was later re-used for the Batman Returns figure line, painted black instead of blue.
 A limited edition The Batman Penguin action figure was made with a red coat, which he wore in just one episode. 
 An action figure based on the Penguin from Batman: The Animated Series came with several accessories, including a teacup and two umbrellas.
 Funko has released a number of Penguin toys, including plushes and small " figures with large heads. These have been modeled off of various Penguin appearances, including Burgess Meredith, Robin Lord Taylor (with or without sunglasses), and Collin Farrell.
 Madame Alexander's DC Fashion Squad line includes a Penguin doll modeled after Danny DeVito's portrayal.

References

Batman in other media